Aron Rafn Eðvarðsson (born 1 September 1989) is an Icelandic handball player who plays for SG BBM Bietigheim and the Icelandic national team.

References

1989 births
Living people
Aron Rafn Edvardsson
Aron Rafn Edvardsson
Handball-Bundesliga players
Expatriate handball players
Aron Rafn Edvardsson
Aron Rafn Edvardsson
Aron Rafn Edvardsson
Aron Rafn Edvardsson